Stanley F. Rozycki was a Democratic member of the Michigan Senate from 1955 through 1974.

Born in Detroit in 1908, Rozycki attended Wayne State University and the University of Detroit. He was owner and president of a family business, the Fireside Printing and Publishing Company. Rozycki won a special election to the Senate in 1955.

Rozycki was a delegate to the 1952 Democratic National Convention and an alternate in 1964.

References

1908 births
2002 deaths
Politicians from Detroit
Wayne State University alumni
University of Detroit Mercy alumni
Death in Florida
Democratic Party Michigan state senators
20th-century American politicians